15810 Arawn, provisional designation , is a trans-Neptunian object (TNO) from the inner regions of the Kuiper belt, approximately  in diameter. It belongs to the plutinos, the largest class of resonant TNOs. It was named after Arawn, the ruler of the Celtic underworld, and discovered on 12 May 1994, by astronomers Michael Irwin and Anna Żytkow with the 2.5-metre Isaac Newton Telescope at Roque de los Muchachos Observatory in the Canary Islands, Spain.

Orbit and physical properties 
Arawn is moving in a relatively eccentric orbit entirely beyond the orbit of Neptune. With a semi-major axis of 39.4 AU, it orbits the Sun once every 247 years and 6 months (90,409 days). Its orbit has perihelion (closest approach to the Sun) of 34.7 AU, an aphelion (farthest distance from the Sun) of 44.1 AU, an eccentricity of 0.12 and an inclination of 4° with respect to the ecliptic. It is a plutino, being trapped in a 2:3 mean motion resonance with Neptune, similarly to dwarf planet Pluto, the largest known plutino.

Observations by the Hubble Space Telescope show that Arawn has a very red surface. In April 2016, its rotation period of 5.47 hours was determined.

Quasi-satellite dynamical state and orbital evolution 
In 2012 Arawn was hypothesized to be in a quasi-satellite loop around Pluto, as part of a recurring pattern, becoming a Plutonian quasi-satellite every 2 Myr and remaining in that phase for nearly 350,000 years. Measurements made by the New Horizons probe in 2015 made it possible to calculate the motion of Arawn much more accurately. These calculations confirm the general dynamics described in the hypotheses. However, it is not agreed upon among astronomers whether Arawn should be classified as a quasi-satellite of Pluto based on this motion, since its orbit is primarily controlled by Neptune with only occasional smaller perturbations caused by Pluto.

Origin
Arawn is moving in a very stable orbit, likely as stable as Pluto's. This suggests that it might be a primordial plutino formed around the same time Pluto itself and Charon came into existence. It is unlikely to be relatively recent debris originated in collisions within Pluto's system or a captured object.

Observation 

Arawn is currently relatively close to Pluto. In 2017 it was only 2.7 AU from Pluto. Before 486958 Arrokoth was discovered in 2014, Arawn was the best known target for a flyby by the New Horizons spacecraft after its Pluto flyby in 2015.

Arawn was one of the first objects targeted for distant observations by New Horizons, which were taken on 2 November 2015. More observations were made in April 2016.

On 2 November 2015 Arawn was imaged by the LORRI instrument aboard New Horizons, making it the closest observation of a Kuiper belt object other than the Pluto–Charon system by a factor of 15.

Between 7–8 April 2016, New Horizons imaged Arawn from a new record distance of about 111 million kilometres, using the LORRI instrument. The new images allowed the science team at Southwest Research Institute (SwRI) in Boulder, Colorado, to further pinpoint the location of Arawn to within 1000 kilometers. The new data also made it possible for scientists to observe its rotation period, which was determined to be 5.47 hours.

Arawn occulted a star on 25 August 2022.

See also 
 Asteroid belt
 List of possible dwarf planets
 List of trans-Neptunian objects

References

Notes

External links 
 Asteroid Lightcurve Database (LCDB), query form (info )
 Dictionary of Minor Planet Names, Google books
 Asteroids and comets rotation curves, CdR – Observatoire de Genève, Raoul Behrend
 Discovery Circumstances: Numbered Minor Planets (15001)-(20000) – Minor Planet Center
 

015810
Discoveries by Anna N. Żytkow
Discoveries by Michael J. Irwin
Named minor planets
New Horizons
19940512